ESPN National Hockey Night is a multiplatform traditional ice hockey simulation video game for the Super NES, Sega Genesis, Sega CD, and personal computers with MS-DOS capabilities.

Gameplay
Like most ESPN games, there is an exhibition mode, a season mode, and a playoff mode. Most of the notable NHL players from the 1990s are included; though their real names are not used, the players' jersey numbers are matched up with the '93-'94 stats of the real world players who wore those numbers.

Reception
GamePro gave the Genesis version a mixed review. They highly praised the ability to switch between vertical and side views, the season mode options, and the adjustable difficulty settings, but criticized the music and "soupy" controls. They concluded that the game is good overall, but overshadowed by NHL 95, which came out at the same time.

Next Generation reviewed the Sega CD version of the game, rating it three stars out of five, and stated that "ESPN NHL is good, very good, but it is not going to give EA's series anything to worry about, at least not for the moment."

See also
NHL FaceOff, Sony's successor for the PlayStation

References

1994 video games
DOS games
ESPN National Hockey League video games
North America-exclusive video games
Sega CD games
Sega Genesis games
Stormfront Studios games
Epic/Sony Records games
Super Nintendo Entertainment System games
Multiplayer and single-player video games
Video games developed in the United States